NGC 741, also known as PGC 7252, is a formerly active radio galaxy in the constellation of Pisces. Located 74.13 Mpc away, NGC 741 is part of a group of galaxies including NGC 742 and PGC 7250. NGC 741 and NGC 742 recently collided, although the disruption was minor. Radio filaments have been found connecting NGC 741 to NGC 742, and due to the bent structure of the radio filaments, NGC 741 is estimated to be moving at 1400 km/s with respect to its local group, suggesting that ram-pressure stripping was created as a product of the former merger.

References

External links 
 

Pisces (constellation)
741
Elliptical galaxies
007252